The 2017–18 Liga Națională was the 60th season of Romanian Handball League, the top-level men's professional handball league. The league comprises 14 teams. Dinamo București were the defending champions, for the second season in a row.

Team changes

To Liga Națională
Promoted from Divizia A
 Politehnica Iași
 Minaur Baia Mare

From Liga Națională
Relegated to Divizia A
 CSM Satu Mare
 Adrian Petrea Reșița

Teams

League table

Standings

Play-Off

Knockout phase

League table – positions 1–4

League table – positions 5–8

Play-Out

Relegation play-offs
The 11th and 12th-placed teams of the Liga Națională faced the 2nd and 3rd-placed teams of the Divizia A, from both Seria A and Seria B. The first place from each play-off group promoted to Liga Națională.

Serie I

Serie II

Third place
Because the winner of Divizia A, Seria B, CSM Oradea declined the participation in the 2018–19 Liga Națională, another play-off match was organised to establish the third place and implicitly the last team promoted. The match was played between the 2nd places from the two Relegation play-offs series.

Notes:
 HC Buzău qualified for 2018–19 Liga Națională and Atletico Alexandria qualified for 2018–19 Divizia A.

Season statistics

Number of teams by counties

References

External links
 Romanian Handball Federaration 

Liga Națională (men's handball)
2017 in Romanian sport
2018 in Romanian sport
2017–18 domestic handball leagues